Jelow, Jilu, Jelu may refer to:
 Jelow-e Olya, Kermanshah Province
 Jelow-e Sofla, Kermanshah Province
 Jelu, Kohgiluyeh and Boyer-Ahmad
 Jelu, Mazandaran
 Jelow, South Khorasan
 Jilu, an Assyrian tribe in southeastern Turkey